Drepanulatrix hulstii is a species of geometrid moth in the family Geometridae. It was described by Harrison Gray Dyar Jr. in 1904 and is found in North America.

The MONA or Hodges number for Drepanulatrix hulstii is 6683.

References

 Scoble, Malcolm J., ed. (1999). Geometrid Moths of the World: A Catalogue (Lepidoptera, Geometridae), 1016.

Further reading

External links

 Butterflies and Moths of North America

Caberini
Moths described in 1904